Two Heavenly Blue Eyes or Two Sky Blue Eyes (German: Zwei himmelblaue Augen) is a 1932 German musical comedy film directed by Johannes Meyer and starring Charlotte Ander, Hermann Thimig and Theo Lingen. It was shot at the Babelsberg Studios in Berlin. The film's sets were designed by the art directors Willi Herrmann and Herbert O. Phillips.

Cast
 Charlotte Ander as Sie  
 Hermann Thimig as Er  
 Theo Lingen as Mr. Bottlekeeper  
 Ida Wüst as Mrs. Thomas, seine Schwester  
 Eva Schmid-Kayser as Ellen, ihre Tochter  
 Sigi Hofer as Schnorrberger  
 Julius Falkenstein as Gerichtsvollzieher Maschke  
 Luigi Bernauer as Der Barsänger  
 Karl Junge-Swinburne as Der Hoteldirektor
 Bruno Steinwald as Der Bardirektor

References

Bibliography 
 Klaus, Ulrich J. Deutsche Tonfilme: Jahrgang 1932. Klaus-Archiv, 1988.
 Willibald Eser. Theo Lingen, Komiker aus Versehen. Langen Müller, 1986.

External links 
 

1932 films
Films of the Weimar Republic
1930s German-language films
Films directed by Johannes Meyer
Films scored by Fred Raymond
German black-and-white films
German musical comedy films
1932 musical comedy films
1930s German films
Films shot at Babelsberg Studios